Esports were featured at the 2018 Asian Games as a demonstration sport, meaning medals won in this sport would not be counted in the official overall medal tally. It was held from 26 August to 1 September 2018. Six video games were featured in the demonstration event, Arena of Valor, Clash Royale, Hearthstone, League of Legends, Pro Evolution Soccer, and StarCraft II.

Competition schedule

Medalists

Medal table

Participating nations
A total of 131 athletes from 18 nations competed in esports at the 2018 Asian Games:

Qualification
Qualification for the six video game title events took place from 6–20 June 2018. Among 45 member nation invited, only 27 NOCs participated in the qualifiers. There were five qualification zones for the regional qualifiers (East Asia, Southeast Asia, South Asia, Central Asia, and West Asia) except for Arena of Valor which only had three regional qualifiers (East Asia, Southeast Asia, and South Asia). Qualification took place either through online matches, offline competitions, or a mix of both formats. Indonesia qualifies for all titles automatically.

Qualification berths

Results

Clash Royale
27 August

Winner group

Loser group

Finals

 The first match between Indonesia and China in the first round was also counted in the final series.

Hearthstone
31 August

StarCraft II
30 August

Pro Evolution Soccer 2018
1 September

Rosters

Preliminary round

Group A

Group B

Knockout round

Arena of Valor
26 August

Winner group

League of Legends

Qualifications & draw 
Teams from same seed and same region could not draw in same group (maximum 2 teams in a group for East Asia).

Preliminary round
27–28 August

 Group stage: Double round robin, best-of-one
 Semifinals: best-of-three
 Medals matches: best-of-five

Group A

Group B

Knockout round

References

External links
eSports at the 2018 Asian Games – Regional Qualification Competitions Results by the Asian Electronic Sports Federation
Electronic sports at the 2018 Asian Games
Asian Electronic Sports Federation (AESF) - Road to Asian Games 2018: Official page for competition schedule, results, visuals

 
2018 Asian Games events
2018 in esports
2018